The finals and the qualifying heats of the Men's 100 metres Freestyle event at the 1997 FINA Short Course World Championships were held on Saturday 1997-04-19 in Gothenburg, Sweden.

Finals

See also
Swimming at the 1996 Summer Olympics - Men's 100 metre freestyle
European LC Championships 1997 - Men's 100 metre freestyle

References
 Results

F